John Barrie (30 June 1924 – 20 April 1996) was one of the leading professional billiards and snooker players from the mid-1940s. His real name was William Barrie Smith.
He won the 1950 UK Professional Billiards Championship defeating Kinsley Kennerley 9046-5069 in the final.

He was born in Wisbech, Cambridgeshire where his family ran The White Lion Hotel. 
In his later career Barrie coached many of England's leading players including Chateriss's Albert ' Snowy' Salisbury and the future 1984 World Professional Billiards Champion Mark Wildman of Peterborough. 
He died in Kings Lynn, Norfolk aged 71.

Tournament wins:(1)

 1951/1952 News of the World Snooker Tournament Qualifying Event

References 

1924 births
1996 deaths
English snooker players
English players of English billiards
People from Wisbech
Sportspeople from Cambridgeshire